Parailurus is a genus of extinct carnivoran mammal in the family Ailuridae. It was about 50% larger than Ailurus (red panda) and lived in the early to late Pliocene Epoch, and its fossils have been found in Europe, North America, and Japan.

The fossils of P. baikalicus carry low-crowned lower molars, along with the main cuspids of the cheek teeth being worn horizontally. This suggests P. baikalicus commonly ate leaves.

References

Pliocene carnivorans
Prehistoric carnivoran genera
Ailuridae
Taxa named by Max Schlosser
Fossil taxa described in 1899